Jackson's Ville is an album by American jazz vibraphonist Milt Jackson featuring performances recorded in 1956 and released on the Savoy label.

Reception
The Allmusic review by Jim Todd stated: "This fine 1956 date features Jackson leading a session that moves with ease and authority through a relaxing eight-minute ride on Charlie Parker's 'Now's the Time,' an Ellington ballad medley, and a pair of the vibist's own blues-based, hard bop compositions. The real treat here is Lucky Thompson's tenor sax. The Don Byas-influenced Thompson has a sound that invites the listener to luxuriate in its grace and strength".

Track listing
 "Now's the Time" (Charlie Parker) – 8:16
 "In a Sentimental Mood/Mood Indigo/Azure" (Duke Ellington) – 6:43
 "Minor Conception" (Milt Jackson) – 8:36
 "Soul in 3/4" (Jackson) – 6:40

Personnel
Milt Jackson – vibraphone
Lucky Thompson – tenor saxophone
Hank Jones – piano
Wendell Marshall – bass
Kenny Clarke – drums

References 

Savoy Records albums
Milt Jackson albums
1956 albums
Albums recorded at Van Gelder Studio
Albums produced by Ozzie Cadena